Phillip Charles Manning (9 October 1906 – 4 November 1930) was an Australian rules footballer who played with Hawthorn in the Victorian Football League (VFL).

Manning, a student of Xavier College, came to Hawthorn from Mentone. He played in the final two rounds of the 1927 VFL season, against Melbourne and Richmond.

On 4 November 1930, Manning was the passenger of a motor cycle which struck a parked wagon on Balcombe Road in Mentone. He was admitted to Alfred Hospital with a fractured skull and died later that day.

References

1906 births
Australian rules footballers from Victoria (Australia)
People educated at Xavier College
Hawthorn Football Club players
Road incident deaths in Victoria (Australia)
Motorcycle road incident deaths
1930 deaths